Prostomis is a genus of beetles in the family Prostomidae.

Species 
The genus Prostomis contains at least 28 accepted species, including:

 Prostomis africana Grouvelle, 1896
 Prostomis atkinsoni Waterhouse, 1877
 Prostomis americanus Crotch, 1874
 Prostomis beatae Schawaller, 1991
 Prostomis cameronica Schawaller, 1992
 Prostomis cornuta Waterhouse, 1877
 Prostomis edithae Schawaller, 1991
 Prostomis gladiator Blackburn, 1903
 Prostomis intermedia Blackburn, 1897
 Prostomis katrinae Schawaller, 1991
 Prostomis kinabaluca Schawaller, 1992
 Prostomis latoris Reitter, 1889
 Prostomis lawrencei Schawaller, 1993
 Prostomis luzonica Schawaller, 1992
 Prostomis magna Ito & Yoshitomi, 2017
 Prostomis mandibularis (Fabricius, 1801) 
 Prostomis mordax Reitter, 1887
 Prostomis morsitans Pascoe, 1860
 Prostomis okinawaensis Ito & Yoshitomi, 2017
 Prostomis pacifica Fairmaire, 1881
 Prostomis papuana Schawaller, 1993
 Prostomis parva Ito & Yoshitomi, 2017
 Prostomis samoensis Arrow, 1927
 Prostomis schlegeli Olliff, 1884
 Prostomis susannae Schawaller, 1991
 Prostomis taiwanensis Ito & Yoshitomi, 2017
 Prostomis tetragona Ito & Yoshitomi, 2017
 Prostomis trigona Ito & Yoshitomi, 2016
 Prostomis yaeyamaensis Ito & Yoshitomi, 2017

References 

Tenebrionoidea
Beetles described in 1825